Karsten Jakobsen (15 July 1928 – 8 January 2019) was a Norwegian engineer. He was a professor and rector (1990–1993) at the Norwegian Institute of Technology, and was the first rector of the Norwegian University of Science and Technology in 1996.

Career
Jakobsen was born in Sandefjord. He graduated as dr.ing. from the Norwegian Institute of Technology, and was appointed professor in mechanical engineering at the Norwegian Institute of Technology in 1982. He was decorated Knight of the Order of St. Olav in 2002. He was awarded the Gunnerus Medal in 2011.

References

1928 births
2019 deaths
People from Sandefjord
Order of Saint Olav
Norwegian engineers
Norwegian Institute of Technology alumni
Academic staff of the Norwegian Institute of Technology
Rectors of the Norwegian University of Science and Technology